A number of ships were named Uganda, including -

, a British cargo liner torpedoed and sunk in 1918.
, a British cargo ship torpedoed and sunk in 1918.
, a British cargo ship built by Harland and Wolff for MacLay & MacIntyre Ltd
, a British passenger ship requisitioned during the Falklands war.

Ship names